"Halfway to Paradise" is a popular song written by Carole King and Gerry Goffin. In the United States, the song was originally recorded in 1961 by Tony Orlando  where it peaked at No. 39 on the Hot 100. In Canada, the song reached No. 3 in the CHUM Charts.

Billy Fury version
"Halfway to Paradise" was much more successful in the United Kingdom when it was recorded by Billy Fury. Fury's version reached No.3 on the British Charts in 1961 and stayed on the charts for 23 weeks, becoming the tenth best-selling single of 1961 in the UK in the process. "Halfway to Paradise" became known as Fury's theme tune and was one of his most popular singles. 
Fury's single was a big production for both Fury and Decca and involved a whole orchestra, directed by Ivor Raymonde. Its success made Fury known for his big ballad numbers, although he began in rock and roll and was always thought of more as a rock musician.
The song also marked the beginning of Fury's burst at the top of the charts that would only begin to slow down on the arrival of fellow Liverpudlian act, the Beatles.

Later versions
In 1968, Bobby Vinton revived "Halfway to Paradise" in a mellow, more romantic version. This recording went to #23 on the Hot 100,  #8 on the Easy Listening chart, and #17 in Canada.  The song was included on the million-selling album "I Love How You Love Me" in early 1969. It was released once again on the 1972 best-selling album Bobby Vinton's All-Time Greatest Hits".
Tina Charles recorded the song for her album Dance Little Lady (1976). 
Nick Lowe released "Halfway to Paradise" as a single in 1977 (backed with "I Don't Want the Night to End", STIFF Records, BUY 21), remaking into a post-punk power ballad, but without any real chart impact. It was later released as a bonus track on the re-release of his 1978 album Jesus of Cool. 
Australian singer Jason Donovan recorded his version of the song for his album Let It Be Me (2008).
A reggae rendition of the song was also recorded in 1989 by Jamaican reggae group the Unique Vision Band.
In 1988, Scottish dance club diva Kelly Marie recorded a floor packing club version of the song.

References

1961 songs
1961 singles
1977 singles
Songs written by Carole King
Songs with lyrics by Gerry Goffin
Tony Orlando songs
Bobby Vinton songs
Tina Charles (singer) songs
Nick Lowe songs
Jason Donovan songs
Decca Records singles
Billy Fury songs
Schlager songs
Stiff Records singles
 Song recordings produced by Mike Smith (British record producer)